Arthur River may refer to:

Arthur River (New Zealand), a river
Arthur River (Tasmania), a river
Arthur River, Tasmania, a town in Australia
Arthur River (Western Australia), a river
Arthur River, Western Australia, a small town on the river of the same name